William George Cambridge (December 13, 1931 – September 30, 2004) was a United States district judge of the United States District Court for the District of Nebraska.

Education and career

Born in Atlantic, Iowa, Cambridge received a Bachelor of Science degree from the University of Nebraska–Lincoln in 1953, and a Juris Doctor from the University of Nebraska College of Law in 1955. He was in the United States Army from 1955 to 1957, remaining in the United States Army Reserve from 1957 to 1965. He was in private practice in Hastings, Nebraska from 1957 to 1981. He was a district judge of the Tenth Judicial District of the State of Nebraska from 1981 to 1988.

Federal judicial service

On April 13, 1988, Cambridge was nominated by President Ronald Reagan to a seat on the United States District Court for the District of Nebraska vacated by Judge C. Arlen Beam. Cambridge was confirmed by the United States Senate on May 27, 1988, and received his commission on June 6, 1988. He served as Chief Judge from 1994 to 1999, and retired from the bench on July 11, 2000.

Death

He died on September 30, 2004 in Omaha, Nebraska.

References

Sources
 

1931 births
2004 deaths
People from Atlantic, Iowa
People from Hastings, Nebraska
Military personnel from Iowa
University of Nebraska–Lincoln alumni
Military personnel from Nebraska
Nebraska state court judges
Judges of the United States District Court for the District of Nebraska
United States district court judges appointed by Ronald Reagan
20th-century American judges
United States Army officers